Alaa El-Din Ahmed (born 28 August 1980) is an Egyptian rower. He competed in the men's coxless pair event at the 2000 Summer Olympics.

References

External links
 
 
 

1980 births
Living people
Egyptian male rowers
Olympic rowers of Egypt
Rowers at the 2000 Summer Olympics
21st-century Egyptian people